Melanthera tenuifolia (formerly Lipochaeta tenuifolia) is a rare species of flowering plant in the family Asteraceae known by the common names Waianae Range nehe and slender-leaf nehe.

It is endemic to Hawaii, where it is known only from the island of Oahu. It grows on mountain slopes and ridges and is limited to the Waianae Range of Oahu. There are 10 occurrences for a total population between 2,000 and 3,000 individuals.

Description
Melanthera tenuifolia is perennial herb produces daisylike yellow flower heads and highly dissected, lacy-looking leaves.

Conservation
It is federally listed as an endangered species of the United States. The main threat to the species is the loss and degradation of its habitat caused by feral ungulates, non-native plants, and fire.

References

External links
USDA Plants Profile for Melanthera tenuifolia

tenuifolia
Endemic flora of Hawaii
Biota of Oahu